Quinn Dupree (born December 15, 2004), known by her stage name quinn is an American rapper, DJ, singer, and producer. Her latest album, quinn, was released on July 22, 2022.

Early life 
Dupree grew up in west Baltimore. Prior to taking on a hyperpop or digicore sound, Dupree made trap metal. She grew up listening to Chicago drill.

Career
In 2019, Quinn joined a Discord server and befriended artists like Midwxst, Saturn, blackwinterwells and Ericdoa, each of which she would release songs with. During the initial COVID-19 lockdowns of 2020, Dupree received widespread exposure from a shoutout by experimental pop duo 100 gecs and her songs (most notably "i don't want that many friends in the first place") were added to Spotify's hyperpop editorial playlist.  In 2021, after a half-year hiatus, Dupree started to release music projects under other aliases such as cat mother for her jungle tracks, trench dog for her ambient tapes, and DJ weird bitch for upwards of hour long mixes. In late 2021 and 2022, Quinn switched to a more hip-hop-influenced style for her debut album, drive-by lullabies and its eponymous successor. She is now performing live. On January 4th 2023, many songs from her discography were removed from streaming services, due to her not enjoying her older music anymore, and she stated that she is "working on a newer, fresher sound [she's] more comfortable with."

Discography

Studio albums

Mixtapes

Extended plays

Singles

Collaborative Singles

References 

2004 births
Living people
21st-century American singers
American women pop singers
American hip hop singers
Pop rappers
Singers from Virginia
African-American women
African-American women composers
Transgender women musicians
Transgender singers
American LGBT singers
American LGBT musicians
LGBT people from Virginia
LGBT people from Maryland
Hyperpop musicians